Stare Strącze  (German: Alt Strunz: 1937-45: Deutscheck) is a village in the administrative district of Gmina Sława, within Wschowa County, Lubusz Voivodeship, in western Poland.

The village has a population of 1,269.

References

Villages in Wschowa County